The 1936 Syracuse Orangemen football team represented Syracuse University in the 1936 college football season. The Orangemen were led by seventh-year head coach Vic Hanson and played their home games at Archbold Stadium in Syracuse, New York. After losing the final seven games of the season, Vic Hanson resigned as head coach.

Schedule

References

Syracuse
Syracuse Orange football seasons
Syracuse Orangemen football